Crump is a city in Hardin County, Tennessee, United States. The population was 1,428 at the 2010 census, and 1,594 at the 2020 census.

Geography
Crump is located in western Hardin County at  (35.232480, -88.336037). It is bordered to the west by the town Adamsville in McNairy County. U.S. Route 64 crosses Crump, leading east  to Savannah and west the same distance to the center of Adamsville.

The community sits on high ground on the west side of the Tennessee River.

Demographics

2020 census

As of the 2020 United States census, there were 1,594 people, 655 households, and 435 families residing in the city.

2000 census
As of the census of 2000, there were 1,521 people, 639 households, and 460 families residing in the city. The population density was 107.9 people per square mile (41.7/km2). There were 751 housing units at an average density of 53.3 per square mile (20.6/km2). The racial makeup of the city was 97.96% White, 0.20% African American, 0.53% Native American, 0.20% Asian, 0.13% from other races, and 0.99% from two or more races. Hispanic or Latino of any race were 0.92% of the population.

There were 639 households, out of which 27.2% had children under the age of 18 living with them, 60.1% were married couples living together, 8.0% had a female householder with no husband present, and 27.9% were non-families. 25.0% of all households were made up of individuals, and 11.4% had someone living alone who was 65 years of age or older. The average household size was 2.38 and the average family size was 2.83.

In the city, the population was spread out, with 22.5% under the age of 18, 6.7% from 18 to 24, 28.3% from 25 to 44, 26.2% from 45 to 64, and 16.4% who were 65 years of age or older. The median age was 41 years. For every 100 females, there were 98.0 males. For every 100 females age 18 and over, there were 93.3 males.

The median income for a household in the city was $29,333, and the median income for a family was $33,179. Males had a median income of $29,897 versus $19,023 for females. The per capita income for the city was $14,700. About 13.4% of families and 15.8% of the population were below the poverty line, including 20.5% of those under age 18 and 21.7% of those age 65 or over.

Education
The Tennessee College of Applied Technology has a location in Crump.

In the early 20th century a Grade School was built where the Park is today named Crump School. It was likely torn down in the 1980s.

Notable person(s)
Dewey Phillips, disc jockey

References

External links

Cities in Tennessee
Cities in Hardin County, Tennessee
Tennessee populated places on the Tennessee River